The Malvern Gazette is a weekly tabloid newspaper published every Friday in Malvern, England. Its offices are based in Hylton Road, Worcester.  The newspaper covers events across the county of Worcestershire as well as some on the outskirts of Herefordshire. There is also a sister title, the Ledbury Reporter, which in 2018 had an average circulation of about 1850 copies per issue.

The newspaper is owned by Newsquest Media Group.

References

External links
Malvern Gazette

Publications established in 1855
Newspapers published in Worcestershire
Malvern, Worcestershire
Newspapers published by Newsquest
Weekly newspapers published in the United Kingdom
1855 establishments in England